The 1941 Duquesne Dukes football team was an American football team that represented Duquesne University as an independent during the 1941 college football season. Duquesne finished undefeated, with a record of 8–0, and was ranked eighth in the final AP Poll. They secured their perfect season by beating previously-undefeated Mississippi State in a rematch of the 1937 Orange Bowl.

Aldo Donelli was the head coach for the first two games but then resigned to become head coach of the Pittsburgh Steelers. Steve Sinko took over as Duquesne's acting head coach after Donelli's resignation. National Collegiate Athletic Association (NCAA) and Duquesne records credit the entire season to Donelli's head coaching record.

Duquesne's John Rokisky was selected by the Associated Press a first-team end on the 1941 All-Eastern football team. Center Al DeMao was named to the second team.

Schedule

References

Duquesne
Duquesne Dukes football seasons
College football undefeated seasons
Duquesne Dukes football